Chiuza is a commune in Bistrița-Năsăud County, Transylvania, Romania. It is composed of four villages: Chiuza, Mireș (Diófás), Piatra (Kőfarka) and Săsarm (Szészárma).

According to statistics from 1760–1762, Piatra village had 58 families, three priests and a church.

References

Communes in Bistrița-Năsăud County
Localities in Transylvania